Electoral Calculus is a political forecasting web site which attempts to predict future United Kingdom general election results. It considers national factors and local demographics.

Main features 
The site was developed by Martin Baxter, who was a financial analyst specialising in mathematical modelling.

The site includes maps, predictions and analysis articles. It has separate sections for elections in Scotland and Northern Ireland.

From April 2019, the headline prediction covered the Brexit Party and Change UK – The Independent Group. Change UK was later removed from the headline prediction ahead of the 2019 general election as their poll scores were not statistically significant.

Methodology 

The site is based around the employment of scientific techniques on data about the United Kingdom's electoral geography, which can be used to calculate the uniform national swing. It takes account of national polls and trends but excludes local issues.

The calculations were initially based on what is termed the Transition Model, which is derived from the additive uniform national swing model. This uses national swings in a proportional manner to predict local effects. The Strong Transition Model was introduced in October 2007, and considers the effects of strong and weak supporters. The models are explained in detail on the web site.

Predictions
Across the eight general elections from 1992 to 2019:
EC correctly predicted the party which won the most seats in seven out of eight (all except 1992).
EC correctly predicted the majority party in four (1997, 2001, 2005, 2019) and the hung parliament outcome in 2010.
The mean polling error for the two largest parties was 4.8%.

Reception 

It was listed by The Guardian in 2004 as one of the "100 most useful websites", being "the best" for predictions. In 2012 it was described by PhD student Chris Prosser at the University of Oxford as "probably the leading vote/seat predictor on the internet". Its detailed predictions for individual seats have been noted by Paul Evans on the localdemocracy.org.uk blog. Academic Nick Anstead noted in his observations from a 2010 Personal Democracy Forum event, that Mick Fealty of Slugger O'Toole considered Electoral Calculus to be "massively improved" in comparison with the swingometer.

With reference to the 2010 United Kingdom general election, it was cited by journalists Andrew Rawnsley and Michael White in The Guardian. John Rentoul in The Independent referred to the site after the election.

The founder of Electoral Calculus, Martin Baxter, and its sole employee, Marwan Riach, have regularly appeared on UK and international media to offer polling expertise to their audience.

References

External links 
 Electoral Calculus

British political websites
Elections in the United Kingdom
Electoral geography
Opinion polling in the United Kingdom
Psephology
Mathematical modeling